Amytis of Babylon (c. 630-565 BCE;;) was a Queen of Ancient Babylon. She was the daughter of the Median king Cyaxares, and the wife of Nebuchadnezzar II.

Name
The female name  is the Latinised form of the Greek name , which perhaps may reflect (with vowel metathesis) an original Median name , meaning "having good thought," and which is an equivalent of the Avestan term .

Life
Amytis was the daughter of Cyaxares, and the sister of Astyages. Amytis had a niece, also named Amytis, from her brother Astyages.

Amytis married Nebuchadnezzar to formalize the alliance between the Babylonian and Median dynasties.

Hanging Gardens of Babylon
Tradition relates that Amytis' yearning for the forested mountains of Media led to the construction of the Hanging Gardens of Babylon, as Nebuchadnezzar attempted to please her by planting the trees and plants of her homeland. Historical evidence, however, does not lend support to this tradition.

References

Bibliography

 

Median people
Babylonian people
Neo-Babylonian Empire
6th-century BC women
Ancient queens consort
Ancient Mesopotamian women
7th-century BC Iranian people
6th-century BC Iranian people
Chaldean dynasty
Median dynasty
Hanging Gardens of Babylon